Jerzy Kowalik (born 15 October 1961) is a retired Polish football midfielder and later manager. He was a squad member for the 1980 UEFA European Under-18 Championship and the 1981 FIFA World Youth Championship.

References

1961 births
Living people
Polish footballers
Wisła Kraków players
Szombierki Bytom players
Górnik Wałbrzych players
Hutnik Nowa Huta players
Tromsø IL players
Poland youth international footballers
Association football midfielders
Polish football managers
Górnik Wieliczka managers
Wisła Kraków managers
Hutnik Nowa Huta managers
Kmita Zabierzów managers
Zagłębie Sosnowiec managers
Polonia Warsaw managers
Kolejarz Stróże managers
Polish expatriate footballers
Expatriate footballers in Norway
Polish expatriate sportspeople in Norway
Eliteserien players